George Loh was the member of parliament for North Dayi in the Volta region of Ghana. He is currently the Volta Regional Vice-chairman of NDC.

Personal life 
Loh is married with one child. He is a Christian (Evangelical Presbyterian).

Early life and education 
Loh was born on 3 July 1972 in Anfoega in the Volta region. He earned LLB at the University of Ghana in 2005. He earned his BL at Ghana School of Law in 2007.

Politics 
Loh is a member of National Democratic Congress. He was a committee member of Constitution, Legal and Parliamentary, Public Accounts.

Employment 
He was a partner at Oak House and Wuuda in Accra as a barrister and solicitor from 2012. He was Associate of Hayibor, Djarbeng and Company from 2007 to 2012.

References 

Living people
1972 births
People from Volta Region
University of Ghana alumni
Ghana School of Law alumni
National Democratic Congress (Ghana) politicians
21st-century Ghanaian lawyers
21st-century Ghanaian politicians
Ghanaian MPs 2013–2017